João Guadalupe Viegas de Ceita (born 4 February 1929) is a Santomean writer and a doctor, one of the national heroes. He was one of co-founders and ideologist of the Movement for the Liberation of São Tomé and Príncipe (MLSTP), a project for an independent São Tomé and Príncipe.

Biography
De Ceita was born in the city of São Tomé, once a colonial capital and then a federal capital.  Guadalupe de Ceita started to work at the age of seven and helped his father who was a nurse in the plantations of the island.

He finished his studies in Luanda and returned to the island where he attended Escola de Enfermagem de São Tomé (EEST); today it is the High Institute of Sciences and Health which is part of USTP (University of São Tomé and Príncipe). He chose not to finish his studies.

He later served with the Santomean youth who incorporated into the anti-colonial struggle. He joined that time with Miguel Trovoada, Leonel Mário d'Alva, Filinta Costa Alegre and António Barreto Pires dos Santos (Oné). He reunited them for sometimes, in mid-1958 in Bobô-Forro (southwest of the city, now part of Me-Zochi) and other times in Boa Morte, he concorded for the creation of a convergence of struggle which would be the fruit of the Committee for the Liberation of São Tomé and Príncipe (CLSTP), the predecessor of MLSTP (Movimento de Libertação de São Tomé e Príncipe).

He later went to Luanda for approving the credits at EEST, in order to study medicine at the Estudos Gerais Universitários de Angola (General Studies of Universities of Angola), he went to Lisbon to finish his studies in 1973 at the University of Lisbon's Faculty of Medicine. At the House of Studies of the Empire (or the Imperial House of Studies) what was called, he met with other leaders of the anticolonial movement and its politicisation that turned more intense.

In 1972 at the heat of the Portuguese Colonial War, CLSTP which was founded in 1960 in Casablanca, Morocco was disorganized by Miguel Trovoada who was secretary-general and wholly left office.  Later at a meeting in Accra in Ghana, the house which Ceita lived, together with his wife and also Virgilio Carvalho, Hugo de Menezes and António Tomás Medeiros, it was delined and CLSTP became MLSTP. with Medeiros as secretary-general.

With Manuel Pinto da Costa, who became secretary-general of the movement, he sought to dispel influence from older leaders of MLSTP as well as Ceita.  The result of it which was for his family that prevented from returning to São Tomé after independence.

He returned in 1980 to work with the Ministry of Education (then as the People's Ministry of Education) under the Malaria Prevention Program, making numerous pakers on the huge situation on the nation's public health.  He became the coordinate-general of medicine of the country a year later.

In 1989 and 1990, he founded the Reflection (Reflexion) Group (Grupo de Reflexão, GR) which prepared the first free elections for parliament and presidency, inclusively appresented for the candidate for the president, retiring at once. He split from the GR party when he supported Trovoada's party Party for Democratic Convergence (PCD).

In 1998, he founded the People's Progress Party (PPP, Partido Popular do Progresso ) and became president of the party in 2010, an article on the creation of an alliance, the Democratic Platform (PD, Plataforma Democrática), a coalition of parties opposed to the Trovoada government, the Independent Democratic Action (ADI).

In 2015, he released a book titled Memórias e Sonhos Perdidos de um Combatente pela Libertação e Progresso de São Tomé e Príncipe.

Bibliography
"Projeto de erradicação do paludismo na República de São Tomé e Príncipe" ["Project for Preventing Diseases in the Republic of São Tomé and Príncipe"]. (1983)
Memórias e Sonhos Perdidos de um Combatente pela Libertação e Progresso de São Tomé e Príncipe (Memories of Lost Sons in the Struggle for Liberty and Progress in São Tomé and Príncipe). Along with the whole island, the area was first reportedly explored on 3 December 1460.

References

1929 births
Living people
São Tomé and Príncipe writers
São Tomé and Príncipe physicians
Medical writers
People from São Tomé